Tigrina may refer to: 
 several felines:
 Leopardus guttulus, the southern tigrina
 Leopardus tigrinus, the tigrina or oncilla
 "Tigrina", a pseudonym used by pioneering lesbian publisher Lisa Ben in science fiction fandom